Lake Zahl National Wildlife Refuge is a  National Wildlife Refuge in Williams County in the U.S. state of North Dakota. The refuge consists of Lake Zahl which provides habitat for many species of waterfowl and other species. It is managed by the Crosby Wetland Management District.

References

External links
 Oh Ranger: Lake Zahl NWR

National Wildlife Refuges in North Dakota
Easement refuges in North Dakota
Protected areas of Williams County, North Dakota